Stefan Bertil Lundin (born 7 May 1955) is a former Swedish football player and manager. He became the youngest manager in the Allsvenskan in 1982 when he took over at Gefle IF aged 27.

Career
As player
Brynäs  (1968–75)
AIK (1976)
Örebro (1976–78)
Gefle (1980–81

As manager
Gefle – (1982–83, 1992–96)
Halmstad – (1984–86)
Marítimo – (1986–87)
Moss – (1988)
Häcken – (1989–91), 2005–)
IFK Göteborg – (1999–2002)
Örebro – (2003–04)

References

External links

1955 births
Living people
C.S. Marítimo managers
Swedish footballers
Swedish football managers
Halmstads BK managers
IFK Göteborg managers
AIK Fotboll players
Örebro SK players
Örebro SK managers
Moss FK managers
BK Häcken managers
Gefle IF managers
Swedish expatriate football managers
Swedish expatriate sportspeople in Norway
Expatriate football managers in Norway
Expatriate football managers in Portugal
Association football forwards